Hugo Gallet (born 20 June 1997) is a French professional ice hockey defenceman. He currently plays for IPK of the Finnish Mestis.

Gallet previously played in the Ligue Magnus for Boxers de Bordeaux before joining IPK on June 14, 2019. He is also a member of the French national team and represented France at the 2018 and 2019 IIHF World Championship.

References

External links

1997 births
Living people
Boxers de Bordeaux players
French expatriate ice hockey people
French expatriate sportspeople in Finland
French expatriate sportspeople in the United States
French ice hockey defencemen
Iisalmen Peli-Karhut players
Sportspeople from Amiens